Richard Langford (fl. 1419) of Wells, Somerset, was an English politician.

Family
Langford married a woman who may have been called Joan. They had two sons, including the MP, Thomas Langford.

Career
He was a Member (MP) of the Parliament of England for Wells in 1419.

References

Year of birth missing
15th-century deaths
English MPs 1419
People from Wells, Somerset